Mammo is a 1994 Indian Hindi film by Shyam Benegal. It stars Farida Jalal, Surekha Sikri, Amit Phalke and Rajit Kapur.

The film won the National Film Award for Best Feature Film in Hindi in 1995. Farida Jalal won Filmfare Critics Award for Best Performance, while Surekha Sikri won the National Film Award for Best Supporting Actress. It was the first film of his Muslim trilogy, which included Sardari Begum (1996) and Zubeidaa (2001). The film was critically acclaimed and is regarded amongst Benegal's best works.

Plot 
13-year-old Riyaz (Amit Phalke) lives a poor lifestyle in Bombay, India, with his grandmother, Fayyuzi (Surekha Sikri), and her sister, Mehmooda Begum, alias Mammo (Farida Jalal). Quite outspoken and embittered over his dad abandoning him, Riyaz does not have many friends, save for Rohan. When Mammo plans a surprise birthday party for him, Riyaz is offended as he believes his friends will make fun of him as his lifestyle is not as good as theirs. Fayyuzi and Riyaz have an argument with Mammo, and she leaves for the mosque at Haji Ali; she returns when they apologize. Although Mammo was born in Panipat during the British Raj, she was one of thousands of Muslims who left for Pakistan after Partition. She and her husband automatically became Pakistani citizens. Although childless, her marriage is a happy one until her husband's death. Over property matters, Mammo is thrown out of the house by her relatives.

Having nowhere else to go, she came to live with her widowed sister in Bombay on a temporary visa. Every month she walks to the nearest police station to get an extension. She finally paid Rs.4800 as a bribe to get a permanent visa through Inspector Apte. When Apte was transferred, a new police inspector took over, processed her papers, took her to be an illegal immigrant, arrested her, had her escorted to the Bombay Central Railway Station and forced her to board the Frontier Mail, which would return her to Pakistan. Riyaz and Fayyuzi make every possible attempt to trace and bring her back, all in vain. Now 20 years later, Riyaz has grown up and has written a book about his Mammo, hoping that someday, somewhere she will find it and they will be reunited.

The movie touches upon several emotional aspects of day-to-day life. Unable to extend her visa, she is deported back to Pakistan. Political priorities defeat humanitarian ones. The director shows a happy ending where Mammo comes to Riyaz and her sister at the end. She pretends that she is dead so that she can continue to stay in India thereafter.

Cast 
 Farida Jalal as Mammo
 Surekha Sikri as Fayyazi
 Amit Phalke as Riyaz (Young)
 Rajit Kapoor as Riyaz (Adult)
 Lalit Tiwari as Riyaz's father
 Himani Shivpuri as Anwari, Mammo's sister
 Shrivallabh Vyas as Sabir
 Sandeep Kulkarni as Inspector Apte
 Rupal Patel as Lady Constable

Soundtrack 

The music soundtrack to Mammo was composed by Vanraj Bhatia and the lyrics were written by Gulzar and the song was sung by Jagjit Singh.

Accolades

References

External links 

1994 drama films
1994 films
1990s Hindi-language films
Films with screenplays by Shama Zaidi
Films directed by Shyam Benegal
Films featuring a Best Supporting Actress National Film Award-winning performance
Films set in Mumbai
Best Hindi Feature Film National Film Award winners
National Film Development Corporation of India films